James Bryson (J.B.) McLachlan (9 February 1869 - 3 November 1937) was a prominent Scottish-Canadian trade unionist, journalist, revolutionary and political activist. McLachlan was one of the leaders of the Canadian Labour Revolt.

Early life: 1869–1902 
The son of Esther Bryson and James McLachlan, James Bryson McLachlan was born in Ecclefechan, Scotland on the 9th of February 1869. Growing up in rural Dumfriesshire both his parents worked as farmer-labourers and cotton weavers. Eventually his family would move up north to Newmains in Lanarkshire in which his father would be employed by the Coltness Iron Company to work in the coal mines. Whilst Mclachlan was only four years old when he left Ecclefechan, he would remember the town fondly as he would make frequent visits to see his grandmother and in doing so would take an interest in the works of Thomas Carlyle who had also came from the same village. At the age of 10 Mclachlan left school to go work in the coal mines, and whilst he never received a formal education he continued to read and teach himself about the world.

Move to Canada: 1902–1907 

In 1902 McLachlan would take on a job with the Nova Scotia Steel and Coal Company and would go onto work at the Princess colliery in Sydney Mines.

Political activity: 1907–1933

Later life and death: 1935–1937

Legacy

References 

1869 births
1937 deaths
Canadian journalists
Canadian trade unionists
Canadian activists